Dołhobrody  is a village in the administrative district of Gmina Hanna, within Włodawa County, Lublin Voivodeship, in eastern Poland, close to the border with Belarus.

The village has a population of 595 as of 2011. According to the National Census of Population and Housing 53.6% of the population are female and 46.4% male.

References

Villages in Włodawa County